Adrienn “Adie” Camp (née Liesching; born 12 July 1981) is a South African singer and songwriter, who is known as the lead singer of the Christian pop-rock band the Benjamin Gate before the group disbanded in 2003. She briefly contributed to other artist's albums, namely her duet with rapper John Reuben featured on his album Professional Rapper and her background vocals on husband Jeremy Camp's albums Restored and  Live Unplugged, after the Benjamin Gate disbanded.

Under the name Adrienne Camp, she released her debut solo album Don't Wait on 26 September 2006 on Capitol CMG. The album was co-produced by her husband Jeremy Camp. Her song "Your Way" climbed into the Top 15 on R&R Magazine's Christian chart in May 2007. Her second album, Just You and Me, was released on 9 March 2010.

Personal life
In December 2003, Liesching married American musician, Jeremy Camp. The couple met on a three-month-long tour in 2002. They have three children.

Voice
Todd Hertz of Christianity Today described Camp's voice as "lovely and ferocious," a "strange combination of Bjork's quavering and the power of Shirley Manson." A reviewer writing for the Daily Herald of Arlington Heights, Illinois described Camp's voice as evocative of Gwen Stefani, Aimee Echo, Christina Aguilera, and Shakira, all the while "remaining very unique and distinctive."

Discography
The Benjamin Gate
 Spinning Head EP
 Comeputyourheadupinmyheart
 Demographics
 Untitled
 Contact

Solo
 Don't Wait  (26 September 2006)
 Just You and Me (9 March 2010)
Duo

 The Worship Project EP (4 September 2020) with Jeremy Camp

References

External links
 Interview

1981 births
Living people
BEC Recordings artists
Performers of Christian rock music
South African Christians
White South African people
21st-century South African women singers
South African songwriters